Stephen Marandi is an Indian politician. He is a leader of Jharkhand Mukti Morcha and a member of Jharkhand Legislative Assembly. He was elected as pro tem speaker of the fourth Jharkhand Legislative Assembly. He is a tribal leader from Santhal Pargana.

Marandi was member of Shibu Soren's Jharkhand Mukti Morcha. He quit Jharkhand Mukti Morcha due to denial of ticket in 2005 Jharkhand Legislative Assembly election and contested as Independent candidate from Dumka constituency against Shibu Soren's son Hemant Soren and defeated him in the election.

In 2005, when former Chief Minister of Jharkhand Babulal Marandi quit Bharatiya Janata Party, he joined Babulal Marandi to form Jharkhand Vikas Morcha (Prajatantrik).

Soon after formation of Jharkhand Vikas Morcha (Prajatantrik), he quit the party and joined hands with Madhu Koda headed government and joined the Indian National Congress soon after. He was also named as Deputy Chief Minister of Jharkhand.

In April 2015, he returned to Jharkhand Vikas Morcha (Prajatantrik) to be re-united with Babulal Marandi. He won 2014 Jharkhand Legislative Assembly election from Maheshpur constituency on Jharkhand Mukti Morcha.

On 12 December 2017, the Bharatiya Janata Party called for Marandi's suspension for organizing a kissing contest for tribal couples in Pakur.

References

Year of birth missing (living people)
Living people
Indian National Congress politicians from Jharkhand
Jharkhand Vikas Morcha (Prajatantrik) politicians
Jharkhand Mukti Morcha politicians
Deputy chief ministers of Jharkhand
Jharkhand MLAs 2000–2005
Jharkhand MLAs 2005–2009
Jharkhand MLAs 2014–2019